Algeria (ALG) competed at the 1975 Mediterranean Games at home in Algiers, Algeria. 314 Algerian competitors took part in this competition and they won 20 medals.

Medal summary

Medal table

Athletics 

Men
Track & road events

Women
Track & road events

Key
Note–Ranks given for track events are within the athlete's heat only
Q = Qualified for the next round
q = Qualified for the next round as a fastest loser or, in field events, by position without achieving the qualifying target
NR = National record
N/A = Round not applicable for the event
Bye = Athlete not required to compete in round

Boxing 

Men

Football

Men's tournament

Group stage

Group A

Semi-finals

Final

See also
Algeria at the Mediterranean Games

References

Nations at the 1975 Mediterranean Games
1975
Mediterranean Games